The Frankfurt Internet Exchange (F-IX) is an Internet Exchange Point located in Frankfurt.

In 2004 the exchange was acquired by XchangePoint Europe, an international network of internet exchanges. In 2005 XchangePoint was acquired by PacketExchange. It was established and serves the city of Frankfurt, Germany.

On 11 March 2020 set a new personal record of 9.1Tbps. The record coincided with increased internet usage during the COVID-19 pandemic.

References 

  XchangePoint Europe (24 March 2004). XchangePoint acquires Frankfurt Internet Exchange. Press release.
  XchangePoint Europe (17 January 2005). PacketExchange acquires XchangePoint. Press release.

External links 
 PacketExchange.net

Internet exchange points in Germany